X-Rated Fairy Tales is the debut album by the rock musician Helios Creed. It was released in 1985 on Subterranean Records.

Track listing

Personnel 
Musicians
John Carlan – synthesizer
Helios Creed – vocals, guitar, synthesizer on "X-Rated Fairy Tales", production
Mark Duran – bass guitar
Bill Roth – drums, tambourine, maracas, percussion, synthesizer
Production and additional personnel
Mike Hills – photography, design
Elena Holt – backing vocals on "X-Rated Fairy Tales"
George Horn – mastering
Ricky Lee Lynd – engineering

References

External links 
 

1985 debut albums
Helios Creed albums
Subterranean Records albums